Stanisław Aniołkowski (born 20 January 1997) is a Polish cyclist, who currently rides for UCI ProTeam .

Major results

2015
 2nd Overall La Coupe du Président de la Ville de Grudziądz
1st  Points classification
1st Stage 4
2016
 4th Road race, National Under-23 Road Championships
2019
 1st  Overall Dookoła Mazowsza
1st  Young rider classification
1st Stage 3
 Carpathian Couriers Race
1st Stages 3 & 5
 1st Stage 4 Course de Solidarność et des Champions Olympiques
 Tour of Romania
1st Stages 2 & 5
 3rd Overall Szlakiem Walk Majora Hubala
1st  Young rider classification
 4th Road race, UEC European Under-23 Road Championships
 7th Trofej Umag
2020
 1st  Road race, National Road Championships
 1st  Overall Bałtyk–Karkonosze Tour
1st Stage 4
 1st  Overall Course de Solidarność et des Champions Olympiques
1st Stage 3 
 1st GP Slovakia
 3rd Puchar Ministra Obrony Narodowej
 3rd Overall Tour of Szeklerland
 6th Overall Tour of Małopolska
1st Stage 1 
 9th Overall Dookoła Mazowsza
2021
 4th Circuit de Wallonie
 6th Bredene Koksijde Classic
 10th Classic Brugge–De Panne
 10th Kampioenschap van Vlaanderen
2022
 4th Clásica de Almería
 7th Elfstedenronde
 8th Ronde van Limburg
 10th Grote Prijs Jean-Pierre Monseré
2023
 6th Trofeo Palma

References

External links
 
 Stanisław Aniołkowski profile at Cycling Database
 Stanisław Aniołkowski profile at Cycling Quotes
 Stanisław Aniołkowski profile at Cycling Fever

1997 births
Living people
Polish male cyclists
Cyclists from Warsaw
21st-century Polish people